Chad competed at the 1996 Summer Olympics in Atlanta, United States.

Results by event

Athletics

Men 

Track and road events

Women 

Track and road events

References
Official Olympic Reports

Nations at the 1996 Summer Olympics
1996 Summer Olympics
Olym